Bracetti Plaza, or Mariana Bracetti Plaza, is a public housing development built and maintained by the New York City Housing Authority in Alphabet City, a section of the East Village neighborhood of Manhattan.  The development is named after Mariana Bracetti (1825-1903), a legendary Puerto Rican woman who was known as the "Arms of Gold", and who was the first to craft the Boriquas Latin Cross, Puerto Rico's first flag.  The flag was designed by Dr. Ramon Emeterio Betances, and is still a symbol of the Puerto Rican independence movement.

The development has 108 apartments housing approximately 312 people. Its neighborhood, the East Village, was formerly included in the Lower East Side, and is still considered the Lower East Side by some, but now the border is generally drawn at Houston Street. The block it sits in is bordered by Avenue B to the west, Avenue C to the east, East 3rd Street to the south, and East 4th Street to the north.

Bracetti Plaza was completed on May 31, 1974. It is serviced by the New York City Police Department's Ninth Precinct, and is governed by Manhattan Community Board 3. , no one is serving as the Resident Association President for Bracetti Plaza.  If someone were, he or she would be a member of the Manhattan South District Citywide Council of Presidents.

See also
List of New York City Housing Authority properties

References

External links
 

Public housing in Manhattan
Buildings and structures completed in 1974
Residential buildings in Manhattan
East Village, Manhattan